Jean Frédéric Bazille (December 6, 1841 – November 28, 1870) was a French Impressionist painter. Many of Bazille's major works are examples of figure painting in which he placed the subject figure within a landscape painted en plein air.

Life and work

Frédéric Bazille was born in Montpellier, Hérault, Languedoc-Roussillon, France, into a wealthy wine merchant Protestant family. Bazille grew up in the Le Domaine de Méric, a wine-producing estate in Castelnau-le-Lez, near Montpellier, owned by his family. He became interested in painting after seeing some works of Eugène Delacroix. His family agreed to let him study painting, but only if he also studied medicine.

Bazille began studying medicine in 1859, and moved to Paris in 1862 to continue his studies. There he met Pierre-Auguste Renoir and Alfred Sisley, was drawn to Impressionist painting, and began taking classes in Charles Gleyre's studio. After failing his medical exam in 1864, he began painting full-time. His close friends included Claude Monet, Alfred Sisley and Édouard Manet. Bazille was generous with his wealth and helped support his less fortunate associates by giving them space in his studio and materials to use.

Bazille was just twenty-three years old when he painted several of his best-known works, including The Pink Dress (c. 1864, Musée d'Orsay, Paris). This painting combines a portrait-like depiction of Bazille's cousin, Thérèse des Hours, who is seen from behind—and the sunlit landscape at which she gazes. His best-known painting is Family Reunion of 1867–1868 (Musée d'Orsay, Paris).

Frédéric Bazille joined a Zouave regiment in August 1870, a month after the outbreak of the Franco-Prussian War. On November 28 of that year, he was with his unit at the Battle of Beaune-la-Rolande when, his officer having been injured, he took command and led an assault on the German position. He was hit twice in the failed attack and died on the battlefield at the age of twenty-eight. His father travelled to the battlefield a few days later to take his body back for burial at Montpellier over a week later.

Main works

 La robe rose, (1864) –   147 x 110 cm, Musée d'Orsay, Paris 
 Studio on Rue Furstenberg, (1865) –  80 x 65 cm, Musée Fabre, Montpellier 
 Aigues-Mortes, (1867) –  46 x 55 cm, Musée Fabre, Montpellier  
 Self-portrait, (1865) –  109 x72 cm, Art Institute of Chicago 
 Family Reunion, (1867) –   152 x 230 cm, Musée d'Orsay, Paris 
 Le Pécheur à l'épervier, (1868) –   134 x 83 cm, Fondation Rau pour le tiers-monde, Zürich 
 View of the Village, (1868) –    130 x 89 cm, Musée Fabre, Montpellier 
 Scène d'été, (1869) –  158 x 158 cm, Cambridge, Harvard University 
 La Toilette, (1870) –   132 x 127 cm., Musée Fabre, Montpellier 
 L'Atelier de la rue Condamine, (1870) –   98 x 128.5 cm, Musée d'Orsay, Paris 
 Paysage au bord du Lez, (1870) –   137.8 x 202.5 cm, The Minneapolis Institute of Arts, Minneapolis

Gallery

See also
 A Studio at Les Batignolles

Notes

References
Pitman, Dianne W. (1998). Bazille: Purity, Pose and Painting in the 1860s. University Park: Penn State University Press. .
Rosenblum, Robert (1989). Paintings in the Musée d'Orsay. New York: Stewart, Tabori & Chang.

External links

Frédéric Bazille at the National Gallery of Art
 Bazille Gallery at MuseumSyndicate 
Impressionism: a centenary exhibition, an exhibition catalog from The Metropolitan Museum of Art (PDF available online), which contains material on Bazille (p. 37–39)

1841 births
1870 deaths
Artists from Montpellier
19th-century French painters
French male painters
French Protestants
Occitan people
Orientalist painters
French military personnel of the Franco-Prussian War
French military personnel killed in action
Deaths by firearm in France
French Impressionist painters
19th-century French male artists